Styrax peruvianus is a species of tree in the family Styracaceae. It is found from Costa Rica south to Peru. It has been classified by the IUCN as a vulnerable species.

References

peruvianus
Vulnerable plants
Trees of Peru
Trees of Costa Rica
Trees of Colombia
Trees of Panama
Trees of Ecuador
Taxonomy articles created by Polbot